George Sylvester Threlfall (11 November 1899 – 2 December 1988) was an Australian rules footballer who played with Richmond in the Victorian Football League (VFL).

Born at Warrnambool he was a son of George Sylvester and Elizabeth Jane (née Holland)Threlfall of Ballangeich. He was the grandson of George Threlfall who founded the business which later became the Phoenix Foundry. He attended St Joseph's Christian Brothers College, Warrnambool. He married Marie Kealey of Abbotsford.

Notes

External links 

1899 births
1988 deaths
Australian rules footballers from Victoria (Australia)
Richmond Football Club players
Warrnambool Football Club players